Providence Women's College, is a college, offering undergraduate, postgraduate courses and opportunities for doctoral and post doctoral studies. Founded by the sisters of Apostolic Carmel, it is located in Kozhikode, Kerala and was established in the year 1952 under the Madras University. The college is now affiliated with University of Calicut. This college offers different courses in arts, commerce and science. This is the first women's arts and science college in the Malabar region of Kerala, South India.

Departments

Science

Physics
Chemistry
Mathematics
Computer Science
Botany
Zoology
Psychology

Arts and Commerce

Malayalam/ Hindi/ French 
English
History
Tourism
Economics
Commerce
Business Administration
Human Resource Management 
5-year Integrated PG in International Relations and Politics

Certificate Courses

Accreditation
The college is recognized by the University Grants Commission (UGC).

Notable alumni
Anna Rajam Malhotra- First women IAS officer 
 Anjali Menon - Film Director, Screenwriter, Producer
 Jomol - Actress
 P T Usha - 16th President of the Indian Olympic Association
 Neena Kurup - Actress

References

External links

Universities and colleges in Kozhikode
Educational institutions established in 1952
1952 establishments in Madras State
Arts and Science colleges in Kerala
Colleges affiliated with the University of Calicut
Academic institutions formerly affiliated with the University of Madras